DLN may refer to:

 Deep lambertian networks
 The IATA code for Dillon Airport
 Driver's License Number
 DLN Series, of the original Mega Man series Robot Master
 ISO 639:dln or Darlong, an unclassified Sino-Tibetan language of India